All About Love is the eleventh studio album by Christian singer Steven Curtis Chapman. It was released on January 16, 2003, by Sparrow Records. Chapman credited his wife, Mary Beth, as the inspiration for the album.

The album includes the first cover songs Chapman ever recorded in his catalogue of music, "I'm Gonna Be (500 Miles)" (originally recorded by The Proclaimers) and "I'll Take Care of You" (originally recorded by Ronnie Milsap).

Track listing
All songs written by Steven Curtis  Chapman, except where noted.
 "All About Love" – 3:42
 "Your Side of the World" – 4:25
 "How Do I Love Her" – 4:57
 "11-6-64" – 3:07
 "You've Got Me" – 3:45
 "I'm Gonna Be (500 Miles)" (Charlie Reid, Craig Reid) – 3:44
 "Echoes of Eden" – 5:04
 "Holding a Mystery" – 4:22
 "We Will Dance" – 4:40
 "We Belong Together (Tarzan and Jane)" – 3:16
 "With Every Little Kiss" – 3:13
 "Miracle of You" – 3:35
 "I'll Take Care of You" (Glen Sutton, Archie Jordan) – 4:23
 "I Will Be Here" – 4:13
 "Moment Made for Worshipping" – 6:10
 "When Love Takes You In" – 4:47

Personnel 
 Steven Curtis Chapman – lead vocals, backing vocals (1, 2, 4-8, 10, 11, 12), acoustic guitar (1-13, 15), electric guitar (1, 2, 5, 11, 12), slide guitar solo (3), acoustic guitar solo (13), acoustic piano (16)
 Chris Mosher – programming (1), synthesizers (1), keyboards (2, 5, 10, 11, 15), Hammond B3 organ (11, 15)
 Scott Sheriff – Hammond B3 organ (1), backing vocals (1, 5, 8, 10, 11, 12), melodica (4)
 Jon Guilotin – keyboards (2, 4, 5, 10, 11), acoustic piano (3, 12), Hammond B3 organ (3, 12), Wurlitzer electric piano (6), Rhodes (7, 13)
 Matt Rollings – acoustic piano (2, 4, 5, 6, 9, 11, 14, 15)
 Adam Anders – keyboards (8), bass (8)
 Bernie Herms – synthesizer (16)
 Randy Pearce – electric guitar (1, 8)
 Tim Pierce – electric guitar (2, 3, 5, 6, 7, 10, 11, 12, 15)
 Joey Canaday – bass (1)
 Leland Sklar – bass (2-7, 10-13, 15)
 Will Denton – drums (1, 8)
 Neil Wilkinson – drums (2-7, 10-13, 15)
 Luis Conte – percussion (2-7, 10-13, 15)
 Carl Marsh – orchestral arrangements and conductor (3, 9, 13-16)
 Gavyn Wright – concertmaster (3, 9, 13-16)
 The London Session Orchestra – strings (3, 9, 13-16)
 John Mark Painter – string arrangements (7, 8)
 David Angell, John Catchings, David Davidson, Conni Ellisor and Pamela Sixfin – strings (7, 8)
 Michael Mellett – backing vocals (1, 3, 8, 11, 12, 15)
 Jerard Woods – backing vocals (3)
 Jovaun Woods – backing vocals (3)
 Gene Miller – backing vocals (5)

Choir on "Moment Made For Worshipping"
 Leigh Ann Albrecht, Travis Cottrell, Nirva Dorsaint, Yvonne Hodges, Fiona Mellett, Michael Mellett, Leanne Palmore, Scat Springs, Jerard Woods and Jovaun Woods

Production 
 Producers – Brown Bannister and Steven Curtis Chapman
 Executive Producer – Mary Beth Chapman
 Recorded by Steve Bishir at NRG (Hollywood, CA), assisted by Joseph Bogan; "All About Love" recorded at Paragon Audio (Franklin, TN), assisted by Hank Nirider.
 Overdubs recorded by Steve Bishir at Oxford Sound (Nashville, TN), assisted by Hank Nirider.
 Tracks 1–3 and 6 mixed by Jack Joseph Puig at Ocean Way Recording (Hollywood, CA), assisted by Chris Sutton.
 Tracks 4, 5 and 7–16 mixed by Steve Bishir at Oxford Sound (Nashville, TN).
 Orchestra recorded by Jonathan Allen and Andrew Dudman at Abbey Road Studios (London, England).
 Digital Editing – Fred Paragano and Hank Nirider
 Mastered by Stephen Marcussen at Marcussen Mastering (Hollywood, CA).
 Music Copyist – Eberhard Ramm
 Production Manager – Traci Bishir, assisted by Michelle Bentrem.
 Photography – Randee St. Nicholas
 Photo Direction – Christiév Carothers
 Art Direction – Jan Cook
 Design – Benji Peck
 Hair and Make-up –Traci Mayer
 Stylist – Gino Tanabe

References

Steven Curtis Chapman albums
2003 albums
Sparrow Records albums